Bahalin is a small village in Slivnitsa Municipality, Sofia Province, located in western Bulgaria approximately 15 km west of the town of Slivnitsa.

Villages in Sofia Province